South Gujarat, also known as Dakshin Gujarat (દક્ષિણ ગુજરાત), is a region in the Indian state of Gujarat. The region has a wetter climate than other regions of Gujarat. The western part is almost coastal and is known as Kantha Vistar ("coastal expanse" in Gujarati), and the eastern part is also known as Dungar Vistar ("hilly expanse"), which ranges from 100 to 1000 metres, with the highest peak at Saputara in the Dang district.

Cities and districts 
Surat is the largest city in the region, the second largest in Gujarat and eighth largest in India. It is the commercial and economic centre of South Gujarat, famous for its diamonds and textile Industries and as a market for apparels and accessories.

Other important cities are Bharuch, Ankleshwar, Navsari, Vyara, Valsad, Pardi, Bardoli, Vapi, Jambusar, Bilimora, Amalsad, Rajpipla, Ahwa, The Dangs, Saputara, and Songadh.

The districts in the region are Surat district, Bharuch district, Navsari district, Dang district, Valsad district, Narmada district and Tapi district.

Notable People from South Gujarat

Freedom fighters 
 Bhulabhai Desai

Politicians
 Dadabhai Naoroji, former Liberal Party Member of Parliament in the British House of Commons, the second person of Asian descent to be a British MP. Known as the "Grand Old Man of India". Born in Navsari in 1825.
 Morarji Desai - former Prime Minister of India, the first from outside the Indian National Congress. Born in Bhadeli village, Bulsar district, Bombay Presidency, British India (present-day Valsad district) in 1896.
 Ahmed Patel - former Congress member of the Lok Sabha representing Bharuch.
 Kanubhai Desai - BJP member of the Gujarat Legislative Assembly, serving as the Minister of Finance and Minister of Energy and Petrochemicals in the Bhupendrabhai Patel government.
 C. R. Patil - BJP member of the Lok Sabha representing Navsari.

Businesspeople
 Jamsetji Tata - founder of what would later become the Tata Group of companies, regarded as the father of Indian industry.

Entertainers
 Freddie Mercury - singer and songwriter for the British rock band Queen, whose family originated from Valsad.

Notable places 
Saputara - a hill station located 172 km from Surat, perched in the Sahayadri mountain range. It is the only hill station in Gujarat.
Dandi - a beach located 45 km from Surat, famous for the Salt March ([Dandi Satyagraha), held in 1930 by Mahatma Gandhi.
 Ubharat Beach - a beach located 45 km from Surat and 30 km from Navsari.
Dumas Beach - a beach in Surat.
Suvali Beach - a beach located 35 km from Surat.
Tithal Beach - a beach located 100 km from Surat and 7 km from Valsad.
Umargam - a town known for its television studio where many mythological drama series are shot.
Barumal Mahadev Temple - a Hindu temple dedicated to the deity Shankar (a form of Shiva), located in Dharampur.
Kabirvad - a banyan tree located on a small river island in the Narmada River, in Bharuch district.
Jagdishchandra Bose Aquarium - a large aquarium in Surat.
Gopi Talav - a lake in Surat.

Education 

 Indian Institute of Information Technology, Surat
 Veer Narmad South Gujarat University
 Sardar Vallabhbhai National Institute of Technology, Surat
 AURO University

References

Regions of Gujarat